Joseph Edward Beinor (November 16, 1917 – January 6, 1991) was an American football tackle in the National Football League (NFL) for the Washington Redskins and the Chicago Cardinals.  He played college football at the University of Notre Dame and was drafted in the sixth round of the 1939 NFL Draft by the Brooklyn Dodgers.

Military service
Beinor became an officer in the United States Marine Corps and was in charge of maintenance for the Patrol Bomber (PBJ) squadron VMB-423 in the South Pacific during World War II.

References

External links
 
 

1917 births
1991 deaths
All-American college football players
American football tackles
United States Marine Corps personnel of World War II
Chicago Cardinals players
Notre Dame Fighting Irish football players
Players of American football from Chicago
Washington Redskins players
Notre Dame Fighting Irish men's track and field athletes
United States Marine Corps officers
Military personnel from Illinois